Back Door is the eponymously titled debut studio album of Back Door, released independently in 1972 by Blakey Records. It received wider distribution when it was adopted by Warner Bros. the following year. It introduced the group's virtuoso approach to jazz, funk, soul, blues and hard rock music. In 2005, the album was listed on JazzTimes' top fifty albums released between 1970 and 2005. In 2014 it was re-released on CD, compiled with 8th Street Nites and Another Fine Mess, by BGO Records. 

The original album cover shows a photograph of the back door of the Lion Inn at Blakey Ridge in the North York Moors. The Warner Brothers re-release shows the Lion Inn in the snow with an small inset picture of the band in front of the inn's back door.

The track "Catcote Rag" is a bass solo named after The Catcote, a pub in Hartlepool (now demolished) where Back Door played regularly.

Track listing

Personnel
Adapted from the Back Door liner notes.
Back Door
 Ron Aspery – alto saxophone, soprano saxophone, flute
 Tony Hicks – drums
 Colin Hodgkinson – bass guitar

Release history

References

External links 
 

1972 debut albums
Back Door (jazz trio) albums
Warner Records albums
Instrumental albums